The 1988 Arab League summit held in June in Algiers, Algeria was the fifteenth Arab League Summit (the twelfth summit in 1981 was divided into two session, with the second session being held in 1982).  The conference which has been held since 1964 had as focus, the topic of the First Intifada, an uprising by the Palestinians against Israeli occupation and the consequent upswing in Israeli-Palestinian violence. The Arab states resolved to support the intifada financially. Other things decided in the conference were their concerns over Iran-Iraq war and displeasure with the United States over its bias in policy over the Arab-Israeli conflict.

References

1988 Arab League summit
History of Algiers
1988 in Algeria
Diplomatic conferences in Algeria
20th-century diplomatic conferences
Arab League
1988 in international relations
Arab League
20th century in Algiers
June 1988 events in Africa